1930 Emperor's Cup Final was the 10th final of the Emperor's Cup competition. The final was played at Koshien South Ground in Hyōgo on February 11, 1930. Kwangaku Club won the championship.

Overview
Defending champion Kwangaku Club won their 2nd title, by defeating Keio BRB 3–0. Kwangaku Club won the title for 2 years in a row. Kwangaku Club was featured a squad consisting of Yukio Goto, Hideo Sakai and Shoichi Nishimura.

Match details

See also
1930 Emperor's Cup

References

Emperor's Cup
1930 in Japanese football